Storm Warning is a 2007 Australian horror film directed by Jamie Blanks and starring Nadia Farès and Robert Taylor.

Plot
Australian lawyer Rob and his beautiful French artist wife Pia spend the day sailing along coastal marshland. While sailing around a headland, they become lost. At nightfall, they dock their boat and plan to relocate their car on foot. In the marsh, they come across a man being beaten by an unseen assailant next to a parked truck on a desolate road. They flee, and stumble upon a decrepit farmhouse just as a torrential rainstorm begins. In a shed on the property, Rob uncovers a large amount of marijuana growing.

Rob and Pia are interrupted when the deranged, redneck owners of the home—Brett, his brother Jimmy, and their father Poppy—return. The brothers, who perceive Rob and Pia as upper-class yuppies, offer them a shower during which they steal their wetsuits. When Rob asks for them back, they begin to insult them. At the dinner table, they taunt Rob for driving a Volvo, and sexually harass Pia. Their intimidation tactics quickly escalate, as Brett threatens to castrate Rob unless Pia kills a joey, which she reluctantly does. Rob and Pia attempt to flee from the house, and stumble upon the corpse of the man they saw being beaten earlier. Rob breaks his leg in the melee, and he and Pia are captured and locked in a barn.

They manage to fashion a booby trap with hooks and other sharp objects found inside the barn, which they dispatch on Brett when he re-enters; the hooks lodge in his face and lift him into the air, after which Pia kills him by beating his head in. Jimmy enters the barn looking for Brett before forcing Pia outside at gunpoint. He brings her into the house and sends her upstairs to Poppy to let him rape her. When Poppy attempts to penetrate her, Pia drives a broken liquor bottle into his groin. She flees into a crawlspace, where she falls through the floor, landing a downstairs room. Jimmy pursues her with a rifle to the barn, where she and Rob hide. When Jimmy enters the barn, he finds Brett's body, during which Rob and Pia manage to steal his rifle before locking him inside.

Rob and Pia enter the house, where Poppy is still upstairs tending to his wound in the bathroom. Pia locates the keys to the brothers' truck, and she and Rob attempt to drive away. While trying to start the truck, Poppy pursues them with a knife, but the blood from his wound attracts his Rottweiler, who eviscerates him. Jimmy attempts to chase the truck with an airboat stored inside the barn, but Pia crashes into him, throwing him into the propeller which shreds his body to pieces. The couple then drive away to safety.

Cast
Nadia Farès as Pia
Robert Taylor as Rob
John Brumpton as Poppy
David Lyons as Jimmy
Mathew Wilkinson as Brett

Production

The script was written by Everett De Roche in the late 1980s or early 1990s and it was sent to director Jamie Blanks in 2005 by Darclight Films' Gary Hamilton. The film was produced by Hamilton and Pete Ford for Darclight Films and Resolution Independent with executive producers Greg Sitch, Martin Fabinyi, Michael Gudinski and Mark Pennell. Cinematography was headed by Karl von Möller.

Blanks soon cast French-based actress Nadia Farès in the lead role of Pia, however he had more difficulty in finding Australia actors to portray either Rob or Poppy. Eventually he acquired Robert Taylor (Rob) and John Brumpton (Poppy). Blanks praised the efforts of David Lyons as Jimmy and Mathew Wilkinson as Brett.

Release

Home media
Dimension Extreme released an unrated version of Storm Warning on 5 February 2008. The DVD contains an audio commentary by director Jamie Blanks, screenwriter Everett De Roche, actor Robert Taylor, cinematographer Karl von Möller, production designer Robby Perkins, and special FX artist Justin Dix, and a making-of featurette.
The DVD was released in Australia on 5 June 2008.

Reception

Jason Buchanan from Allmovie gave the film a negative review, stating that the film didn't bring anything new to the genre and criticized the film's lack of originality. 
Sean DeArmond from Horror News.net gave the film a mixed review, complimenting the film's acting, but criticized the film's runtime, lack of likable lead characters, and overuse of cloud shots. In his review, DeArmond concluded, "the movie does what it sets out to do. The content is cringe worthy and often unnerving, but it never drops the ball it has chosen to carry. If it sounds like your thing, have at it. We, however, are going to put in a light comedy to decompress."

Accolades
Justin Dix won the Screamfest Festival Trophy for Best Special Effects.

References

External links
 
 
Film Review
 
Storm Warning at Oz Movies

Australian horror films
Australian slasher films
2007 films
2007 horror films
Dimension Films films
2000s slasher films
Films directed by Jamie Blanks
2000s English-language films